Thalassiopsis is a monotypic genus of Malagasy nursery web spiders containing the single species, Thalassiopsis vachoni. It was first described by Carl Friedrich Roewer in 1955, and is only found on Madagascar.

See also
 List of Pisauridae species

References

Monotypic Araneomorphae genera
Pisauridae
Spiders of Madagascar
Taxa named by Carl Friedrich Roewer